The 1961–62 LFF Lyga was the 41st season of the LFF Lyga football competition in Lithuania.  It was contested by 24 teams, and Atletas Kaunas won the championship.

Group I

Group II

Final

References
RSSSF

LFF Lyga seasons
1961 in Lithuania
1962 in Lithuania
LFF
LFF